Under the Pipal Tree is the debut studio album by Japanese post-rock band Mono. It was released on November 11, 2001 on Tzadik Records.

In 2016, Under the Pipal Tree was included at number 30 on Facts list of the best post-rock albums, while Paste ranked it the 18th best post-rock album.

Track listing

References

2001 debut albums
Mono (Japanese band) albums
Tzadik Records albums